Lusi River is a river in northern Central Java, Indonesia, about 400 km east of the capital Jakarta. It is a tributary of the Serang River, meeting after passing the city of Purwodadi.

Hydrology
Lusi River is one of the longest in Central Java, with a length of 208.5 km and the basin size of 3656.78 km².

Geography
The river flows in the central area of Java with predominantly tropical monsoon climate (designated as Am in the Köppen-Geiger climate classification). The annual average temperature in the area is 25 °C. The warmest month is October, when the average temperature is around 28 °C, and the coldest is January, at 24 °C. The average annual rainfall is 2845 mm. The wettest month is January, with an average of 527 mm rainfall, and the driest is September, with 35 mm rainfall.

See also
List of rivers of Indonesia
List of rivers of Java

References

Rivers of Central Java
Rivers of Indonesia